Drew Leon "Lefty" Rader (May 14, 1901 – June 5, 1975) was a Major League Baseball pitcher. In 1 career game, he had a 0–0 record, with a 0.00 ERA, pitching in 2 innings. He batted right-handed and threw left-handed.

Rader was born in Elmira, New York and died in Catskill, New York.

References

External links

1901 births
1975 deaths
Pittsburgh Pirates players
Major League Baseball pitchers
Baseball players from New York (state)
Syracuse Orangemen baseball players